The 31st World Science Fiction Convention (Worldcon), also known as Torcon II, was held on 31 August–3 September 1973 at the Royal York Hotel in Toronto, Ontario, Canada.

The chairman was John Millard.

Participants 

Attendance was approximately 2,900.

Guests of Honour 

 Robert Bloch (pro)
 William Rotsler (fan)
 Lester del Rey (toastmaster)

Awards

1973 Hugo Awards 

 Best Novel: The Gods Themselves by Isaac Asimov
 Best Novella: The Word for World is Forest by Ursula K. Le Guin
 Best Novelette: "Goat Song" by Poul Anderson
 Best Short Story:
 "Eurema's Dam" by R. A. Lafferty and
 "The Meeting" by Frederik Pohl and Cyril M. Kornbluth (tie)
 Best Dramatic Presentation: Slaughterhouse-Five
 Best Professional Editor: Ben Bova
 Best Professional Artist: Frank Kelly Freas
 Best Amateur Magazine: Energumen edited by Mike Glicksohn and Susan Wood Glicksohn
 Best Fan Writer: Terry Carr
 Best Fan Artist: Tim Kirk

Other awards 

The 31st Worldcon was the first one in which the John W. Campbell Award for Best New Writer was awarded.

 Special Award: Pierre Versins for L'Encyclopedie de l'Utopie et de la science fiction
 John W. Campbell Award for Best New Writer: Jerry Pournelle

See also 

 Hugo Award
 Science fiction
 Speculative fiction
 World Science Fiction Society
 Worldcon

References

External links 

 NESFA.org: The Long List
 NESFA.org: 1973 convention notes 

1973 conferences
1973 in Canada
Science fiction conventions in Canada
Worldcon